Mount Greenfield is an ice-free mountain rising to  and surmounting the western extremity of Stephenson Bastion in the Shackleton Range of Antarctica. It was mapped in 1957 by the Commonwealth Trans-Antarctic Expedition (CTAE) and named after George C. Greenfield, a literary agent of the CTAE from 1955 to 1958.

References

Mountains of Coats Land